Manyi Kiss (Born Margit Kiss; 12 March 1911 – 24 March 1971) was a Hungarian actress.

Career
She was born in Magyarlóna, Kolozs County, Hungary (now Luna de Sus, Romania), to Lajos Kiss and Zsuzsanna Nagy. She acted from 1926 in Cluj (in Hungarian: Kolozsvár), from 1928 in Miskolc and then between 1929 and 1932 in Szeged, Hungary. From the beginning of her career she possessed a natural acting style, an excellent knowledge of dance and ability to sing comic roles. From 1932, for a while she performed with her Italian artist husband in circuses abroad. In 1934 she made her debut in Budapest but was not contracted to any theatre. She was acting at the Pódium Cabaret. In 1940, the Capital Operetta Theatre contracted her, but she also performed at the Hungarian Theatre, the Andrássy Avenue Theatre, the Erzsébetvárosi Theatre, the Márkus Park Theatre and the Vidám Theatre. She joined the Vígszínház in 1943, by which time she had become one of the Budapest's favourite performers.

After World War II she performed in numerous Budapest venues, but only contracted for individual roles out of necessity – as politically she became persona non grata under the communist regime – someone had seen her sing to soldiers at the front. In 1954 she worked with the Madách Theatre. In that decade she concentrated on dramatic roles, e.g., in Brecht's Mother Courage and Her Children. From then on, her ouvre expanded to include grotesque, tragi-comic and dramatic heroic roles with unfettered style and extraordinary range and accuracy. Her colleagues noted the brevity with which she was able to master a role in very little time at all. The Madách Theatre contract ended her career with some well-deserved honours from the state: Jászai Mari Award (1954), Kossuth Prize (1957) an outstanding award (1962) and an artistic excellence award (1964).

Her colleagues only learnt of her terminal illness during her final days. She died in Budapest.

Main roles
Her repertoire included Kálmán's Die Csárdásfürstin; Chekhov's Three Sisters; Molière's Les Femmes Savantes; Goodrich-Hackett's The Diary of Anne Frank; and Shaffer's Black Comedy.

Film roles
She performed in 81 films and TV series from the middle 1930s to 1971.

Selected filmography
 Cafe Moscow (1936)
 Cserebere (1940)
 Mattie the Goose-Boy (1950) 
 Professor Hannibal (1956)
 Sziget a szárazföldön (1969), R: Judit Elek

External links

Kiss Manyi's statue in the park of the National Theatre

1911 births
1971 deaths
Hungarian stage actresses
Hungarian film actresses
20th-century Hungarian actresses
Burials at Farkasréti Cemetery